Monaco competed at the 2017 World Aquatics Championships in Budapest, Hungary from 14 July to 30 July.

Swimming

Monaco has received a Universality invitation from FINA to send two swimmers (one man and one woman) to the World Championships.

References

Nations at the 2017 World Aquatics Championships
Monaco at the World Aquatics Championships
2017 in Monégasque sport